Filippo Nardi (born 3 March 1998) is an Italian professional footballer who plays as a midfielder for  club Reggiana, on loan from Cremonese.

Club career
Nardi is a creative midfielder, who transferred from Montebelluna in the Serie D, to Novara in the Serie B in 2016 after a successful debut season. Nardi made his professional debut for Novara in a 1-0 win over Cesena on 6 May 2017.

On 22 September 2020, he joined Cremonese on loan. On 14 June 2021, Cremonese exercised the purchase option in the loan contract. On 31 January 2022, Nardi was loaned to Como. On 18 August 2022, Nardi moved on loan to Reggiana, with an option to buy.

References

External links 

Nardi Novara Calcio Profile

1998 births
Living people
Sportspeople from Treviso
Italian footballers
Association football midfielders
Calcio Montebelluna players
Novara F.C. players
U.S. Cremonese players
Como 1907 players
A.C. Reggiana 1919 players
Serie B players
Serie C players
Serie D players
Footballers from Veneto